Rosalia lameerei is a species of beetle in the family Cerambycidae. It was described by Brogn in 1890.

References

Compsocerini
Beetles described in 1890